In British English, a tout is any person who solicits business or employment in a persistent and annoying manner.

Tout may also refer to:

Tout (surname)
Tout (company), a social networking and microblogging service
Tout Quarry, a former quarry and sculpture park in Dorset, England, in the United Kingdom